The St. Joseph River (known locally as the St. Joe) is a tributary of Lake Michigan with a length of . The river flows in a generally westerly direction through southern Michigan and northern Indiana, United States, to its terminus on the southeast shore of the lake. It drains a primarily rural farming area in the watershed of Lake Michigan. It was enormously important to Native Americans and greatly aided in the colonial exploration, settlement and administration of New France and the nascent United States as a canoe route between Lake Michigan and the watershed of the Mississippi River.

Description of the watershed

The St. Joseph River watershed drains  from 15 counties: Berrien, Branch, Calhoun, Cass, Hillsdale, Kalamazoo, St. Joseph and Van Buren in Michigan and De Kalb, Elkhart, Kosciusko, LaGrange, Noble, St. Joseph and Steuben in Indiana. The watershed includes 3,742 river miles (6,022 km) and flows through and near the Kalamazoo-Portage, Elkhart-Goshen, Mishawaka-South Bend, and St. Joseph/Benton Harbor metropolitan areas. Baw Beese Lake was historically named for the Potawatomi Chief Baw Beese.

The river follows a zigzag route generally westward across southern Michigan, dipping into northern Indiana. From its headwaters, it flows initially northwest past Hillsdale into southeastern Calhoun County, then turns abruptly southwest to flow past Tekonsha, Union City, and Sherwood. At Three Rivers it is joined from the north by the Rocky and Portage rivers, then  further southwest by the Prairie River from the east. The river continues southward into northern Indiana, flowing west through Elkhart, Mishawaka, and South Bend, where it turns abruptly to north to re-enter southwestern Michigan in southeastern Berrien County. In southwestern Michigan, it follows a wide meandering route generally northwest through Niles and past Berrien Springs.

There are 190 dams in the St. Joseph River watershed, and 17 on the river mainstem. Most of these dams block fish passage, although fish ladders constructed on the lower dams allow salmonine passage as far as the Twin Branch Dam in Mishawaka, Indiana. But, the fish ladders are not adequate for many native species, such as sturgeon, and the dams tend to be built on the higher gradient portions of the river, which are the most critical river habitats for fish spawning.

History

saakiiweesiipiiwi (Outlet River, also historically spelt Sakiwasipi), as it was called by the Miami people, was inhabited for thousands of years by various indigenous tribes as it served an essential trade avenue in the Great Lakes region. The most recent indigenous inhabitants of the area were the Miami and Potawatomi peoples. Two different portages allowed nearly continuous travel by canoe among different watersheds of the region. The first major transfer point was at the headwaters in southwestern Michigan, where travelers could make a portage to the St. Joseph River of the Maumee River watershed, which drained into Lake Erie. The second major transfer point was at South Bend, Indiana, where a short portage to the nearby Kankakee River allowed access to the Illinois River and subsequently to the Mississippi. Another major access point along river was at Niles, Michigan, where the Old Sauk Trail, a major east-west Indian trail, crossed the river.

The indigenous trade and navigation networks in the area allowed for extensive trade and movement of people, which allowed early Europeans access to the area in 1675 when Père Jacques Marquette was guided up the Mississippi River via the Illinois River, then to the Kankakee River and portaged to Sakiwasipi and then down to Lake Michigan. On November 1, 1679 René Robert Cavelier, Sieur de La Salle sailed southeast across Lake Michigan and built Fort Miami at the mouth of the river. La Salle named the river La Rivière des Miamis (River of the Miamis).

At the end of 1679, La Salle followed indigenous trade routes in the opposite direction of that taken by Marquette; heading up the St. Joseph River and portaging to the Kankakee River, getting as far west on the Illinois River as modern-day Peoria, Illinois, before returning to Fort Miami. After giving up on the return of his ship, Le Griffon, in April 1680, he became the first European to walk the well traveled indigenous routes east across the Lower Peninsula of Michigan back to the Detroit River and Canada. The French established Fort St. Joseph at the crossroads of Old Sauk Trail and this well-established east–west trail in 1691.

The watershed was later used as canoe route by early French fur trappers in the Illinois Country. European American settlement of the St. Joseph river basin area began to increase in earnest after southwestern Michigan was surveyed in 1829.  From the early 1830s until 1846, the river bore various commodities from upstream to a busy port at St. Joseph, where they were loaded onto lake boats for shipment to Chicago and elsewhere.

The cause of the seiche was unknown, but has been attributed to a sudden squall or change in atmospheric pressure.

South Bend Race Canals
Factories located in South Bend because of access to the river and hydro-power created in the East and West Races.
The water rights to what would become the East and West Races  were claimed by Alexis Coquillard and  Lathrop Taylor in 1831, when the city of South Bend was founded. 
Although the idea of digging a mill race (man-made canal) was put forth in 1835, a dam and the East and West Races were not constructed until 1843. The construction was done by the South Bend Manufacturing Company, incorporated in December 1842 for this very purpose. The South Bend Manufacturing Company thus became owner of the water power rights on the West Race canal, while Samuel L. Cottrell purchased the water rights along the East Race canal.

In 1867 the South Bend Hydraulic Company purchased the rights to the East Race canal for $100. In 1903 the ownership of stock, property rights, and property of the South Bend Manufacturing Company on the West Race canal passed to the Oliver Chilled Plow Works. Over the next two years the Oliver Chilled Plow Works constructed a hydro-electric power plant on the waterway to supply electricity for light, heat, and power to the Oliver Opera House, Oliver Hotel, South Bend factories, and other Oliver buildings.

Other sources of energy and changes in technology resulted in the canals no longer being used for industrial purposes. In the late 1940s the Indiana and Michigan Electric Company purchased the rights along the East Race canal. They began filling it in around 1954 for re-use for other purposes. In 1973 the Oliver Chilled Plow Works hydro-electric plant was demolished to make room for construction of the Century Center, which was completed in 1977. The West Race still exists as a canal North of Jefferson Boulevard and South of Colfax Avenue on the banks of Century Center,  between Pier Park and Island Park.

In the early 1980s, the East Race canal was re-excavated. It was converted to a man-made whitewater kayaking course, now known as the East Race Waterway.

East Race Waterway

In 1984, the abandoned East Race canal in South Bend, whose outlets were both at the river, was converted into the East Race Waterway, North America's first artificial whitewater waterway and the first of four in the United States. Locals first proposed in 1973 that the 19th-century waterway be reopened; construction began in August 1982 and the East Race reopened on June 29, 1984. Through the use of movable barriers and obstacles, the East Race can be configured to provide a  whitewater course for recreational and competitive canoeing, kayaking and rafting. In 2021, the East Race was temporarily closed for construction. The City of South Bend is building a hydroelectric dam on the waterway. The project was funded by the University of Notre Dame.

Historic sites
Two sites in the river basin, Moccasin Bluff and Fort St. Joseph, are listed on the U.S. National Register of Historic Places.  Carey Mission, Fort Miami, and Burnett Trading Post are listed as State Registered Historic Sites.

Ecology and conservation
Before European settlement, the watershed was dominated by deciduous forests consisting of maple, ash, oak, elm, walnut, and beech species, along with pockets of white, red and jack pine species. There were also prairies up to several miles across, which were grazed by elk (Cervus canadensis), white-tailed deer (Odocoileus virginianus), moose (Alces alces), and bison (Bison bison). By 1900 the virgin forests were mostly logged, and the prairies largely converted to agricultural use, as were many drained wetlands.

Among the unique natural features that remain in the watershed are prairie fens, coastal plain marshes, bogs, floodplain forests, hardwood swamps, and moist hardwood forests. Rare plants include prairie dropseed (Sporobolus heterolepis), rosinweed, tall beak rush, and umbrella grass.

The wetlands and floodplain forests provide habitat to nearly half of all migratory birds in Indiana and Michigan and are a vital habitat for resident species as well, such as wild turkey (Meleagris gallopavo), coyote (Canis latrans), fox, beaver (Castor canadensis), mink (Neogale vison), Indiana bat (Myotis sodalis), eastern box turtle (Terrapene carolina carolina),  and the rare spotted turtle (Clemmys guttata) and northern redbelly snake (Storeria occipitomaculata occipitomaculata), both protected by the state of Michigan. The lower Pigeon River is home to the federally endangered Indiana Bat.

In 1969, the Michigan Department of Natural Resources began stocking the lower  of the river for steelhead trout (Oncorhynchus mykiss), Chinook salmon (Oncorhynchus tshawytscha) and coho salmon (Oncorhynchus kisutch). In 1980 the Michigan Department of Natural Resources, Indiana Department of Natural Resources and United States Fish and Wildlife Service signed the "St. Joseph River Interstate Cooperative Salmonid Management Plan", which led to construction of fish ladders at the Buchanan, Niles, South Bend and Mishawaka dams. This enabled the trout and salmon to spawn in coldwater tributaries such as McCoy Creek.

Although completion of fish ladders on the lowest five mainstem dams in 1992 allowed salmonine passage as far as Twin Branch Dam in Mishawaka, Indiana, 94% of the fish that pass are salmon and trout, as the ladders were not designed to permit passage of migrating native fish. Historically, the migrating native species included lake sturgeon (Acipenser fulvescens), bass (smallmouth and largemouth), redhorse (silver, golden, shorthead, river, and greater) (Moxostoma ssp.), walleye (Sander vitreus), lake trout (Salvelinus namaycush), lake whitefish (Coregonus clupeaformis), northern pike (Esox lucius) and American pickerel (E. americanus vermiculatus). Every spring the Potawatomi and early settlers used spears, seines and dip nets to catch their annual supply of fish. The abundance of lake sturgeon made the area around Niles famous in the mid-to late-1800s. Sturgeon used to migrate as far as Hillsdale County, Michigan, and Sturgeon Lake near Colon, Michigan still bears the name of this mighty fish. Historically, ninety-seven species of fish were native to the St. Joseph River Basin.

In 1994, the Friends of the St. Joe River (FotSJR), a non-profit conservation organization, was founded by Athens, Michigan residents Al and Margaret Smith, to organize the river communities to clean and restore the river. In 2002 FotSJR developed the St. Joseph River Watershed Management Plan, with grant support from the Michigan Department of Environmental Quality. The river delivers significant pollutants to Lake Michigan - including sewage overflows from riverside communities, sediments and toxic substances such as mercury and polychlorinated biphenyl (PCB). When the plan was developed, the river carried the greatest portion of atrazine into Lake Michigan.  It is an agricultural herbicide associated with cancer even at low levels and is a very common contaminant of drinking water.

Recreation
The economic benefits to local Michigan and Indiana communities are estimated at several million dollars annually.

Canoeists can travel the entire length of the main stem, if they are prepared to portage.  Many of the larger tributaries offer excellent opportunities for paddling, hiking, hunting, and fishing.

Cities and towns along the St. Joseph River

Indiana
 Bristol
 Elkhart
 Mishawaka
 Osceola
 South Bend

Michigan
 Benton Harbor
 Berrien Springs
 Buchanan
 Burlington
 Constantine
 Fair Plain
 Hillsdale
 Jonesville
 Litchfield
 Mendon
 Niles
 St. Joseph
 Tekonsha
 Three Rivers
 Union City
 White Pigeon

Dams 
A list of major dams on the St. Joseph River.

Crossings 

There are over 48 highway and local street crossings over the length of the St. Joseph River watercourse.  Many of the crossings are concentrated in the urbanized areas located along the cities of South Bend, Mishawaka, and Elkhart, Indiana.

See also
 List of Indiana rivers
 List of Michigan rivers

References

Further reading

Webster, Mildred E. and Krause, Fred (1986). French St. Joseph: Le Poste De La Rivière St. Joseph. n.p. Mildred E. Webster.

External links

 
 Friends of the St. Joe River Association, Inc. (FotSJR)
 Saint Joseph River Watershed Website
 St. Joseph River Interstate Anadromous Fish Project
 Michigan DNR Fisheries Special Report No. 24--Executive Summary on the Saint Joseph River
 USGS Paw Paw River Flow Data at Riverside, Michigan (The Paw Paw is the last major tributary of the Saint Joseph before it flows into Lake Michigan)
 USGS St. Joseph River Flow Data at Niles, Michigan
 USGS St. Joseph River Flow Data at Mottville, Michigan
 USGS St. Joseph River Flow Data at Three Rivers, Michigan
 USGS St. Joseph River Flow Data at Burlington, Michigan
 East Race Waterway - South Bend Parks and Recreation

Portages in the United States
Rivers of Indiana
Rivers of Michigan
Important Bird Areas of Michigan
Tributaries of Lake Michigan
Artificial whitewater courses
Rivers of Berrien County, Michigan
Rivers of Branch County, Michigan
Rivers of Calhoun County, Michigan
Rivers of Cass County, Michigan
Rivers of Hillsdale County, Michigan
Rivers of Kalamazoo County, Michigan
Rivers of St. Joseph County, Michigan
Rivers of Van Buren County, Michigan
Rivers of DeKalb County, Indiana
Rivers of Elkhart County, Indiana
Rivers of Kosciusko County, Indiana
Rivers of LaGrange County, Indiana
Rivers of Noble County, Indiana
Rivers of St. Joseph County, Indiana
Rivers of Steuben County, Indiana